Irini Lambraki (5 January 1949 – 20 July 2018) was a Greek politician.

Life
Lambraki was born in Ioannina in 1949. She studied at the Law School of Athens and completed her postgraduate studies of Commercial Law at the University of Munich and the University of Perugia (art history and Italian literature).

Lambraki became a PASOK MP in the Athens B electoral district from 1977 to 1989 and Deputy Minister of Culture from 1988 to 1989. She was also a PASOK MEP (1994-1999). She was member of the Council of Europe between 1982 and 1985.

Lambraki died on 20 July 2018 while she was on vacation in Skiathos; her death was attributed to pathological causes. Her body was moved to Athens under the care of the Greek Parliament.

References

1949 births
2018 deaths
Members of the Parliamentary Assembly of the Council of Europe
Greek socialists
PASOK politicians
PASOK MEPs
Greek MPs 1977–1981
Greek MPs 1981–1985
Greek MPs 1985–1989
MEPs for Greece 1994–1999
20th-century women MEPs for Greece
University of Perugia alumni
Politicians from Ioannina